Do Androids Dream of Electric Sheep? is a science fiction novel by American writer Philip K. Dick.

Do Androids Dream of Electric Sheep? may also refer to:

 Do Androids Dream of Electric Sheep? (comic book)
 Do Androids Dream of Electric Sheep?: Dust To Dust

See also
 Blade Runner (disambiguation)